Edward "DJ Eddie F" Ferrell (born March 25, 1968) is an American producer, DJ, songwriter, executive and entrepreneur. He is co-founder and partner of the rap group Heavy D & the Boyz.
He is also mostly known for his various work and projects serving as the founder and owner of Untouchables Entertainment Group, Untouchables Records, numerous major label clients and their artists.

Early career
The Mount Vernon, New York native made his entry into production in the late 1980s on the gold certified Heavy D & the Boyz debut Living Large with "Mr Big Stuff". Eddie continued to show his production prowess on their follow-up platinum releases, Big Tyme and Peaceful Journey, creating such classics as "Somebody For Me" and "You Ain’t Heard Nothin’ Yet", to name a few. He has been largely responsible and instrumental in delivering or developing much of the talent coming out of the Mt. Vernon area such as Heavy D, Al B. Sure, Pete Rock & CL Smooth, Dave Hall, and even Diddy who lived with Eddie in his home studio loft for a while during the early stages of his Uptown Records, A&R career.

In the late 1980s, Eddie created Untouchables Entertainment in order to bolster the careers of promising young producers, writers and artists. Credited with originating the first modern "production camp," the company featured multi-platinum production and writing architects, including Eddie F himself, Pete Rock, Dave Hall, Kenny Greene, Mary Brown, Kenny Smoove and Donell Jones, who produced, wrote, and/or remixed songs for recording artists such as TLC, Mariah Carey, Mary J. Blige, LL Cool J, Will Smith, Jodeci, Destiny's Child, Jaheim, Luther Vandross, and Run DMC.

A pioneer in the sampling hip hop & r&b revolution, Eddie F and his Untouchables team are also credited with creating the first “featured artist remix” whereby a track was musically reworked and replaced by an entirely new track (remixed) and a “featured” rap artist that was not on the original song added a totally new rap and artist performance on the newly remixed track. The project that first originated this “featured rap remix“ concept was the 1990 remix of Johnny Gill's Rub You the Right Way, “featuring” CL Smooth.

By the early 1990s, Eddie had discovered and executive produced gold certified projects for rap duo Pete Rock & CL Smooth and R&B trio Intro. During this year, Eddie also created the theme song music for the popular Fox television series In Living Color starring then up and coming comedians Jamie Foxx, Jim Carrey, The Wayans Brothers and "fly girl" Jennifer Lopez.

In the mid-1990s, he added the title of Vice President of A&R for LaFace Records to his repertoire, reporting to co-owner and founder, LA Reid and was responsible for assisting Reid in managing its talent roster including Usher, OutKast, TLC and Toni Braxton. He would also serve as A&R for the Grammy winning album of The Tony Rich Project, Words.

During this year, Eddie simultaneously released Eddie F. and the Untouchables: Let's Get It On- the album on Motown Records. Spotlighting the works of the Untouchables camp, the compilation featured the only known in-studio collaboration of two up-and-coming hip-hop MC's at the time, 2Pac and The Notorious B.I.G., on the title track "Let's Get It On"- which also featured Heavy D and Grand Puba.

He later segued to Motown Records as the Executive Vice President of A&R- managing a roster including Queen Latifah, Stevie Wonder, Diana Ross, The Temptations, and Boyz II Men, as well as newcomers 98 Degrees, 702, Taral Hicks, and his personal signing of Mario Winans.
This was also around the time that he discovered a then unknown Chicago singer named Donell Jones. Eddie quickly invested in Jones by making him a part of the Untouchables Records family. He then secured a distribution outlet for Jones and further developed his relationship with LA Reid and LaFace Records spawning the hit single "U Know What's Up" featuring Left Eye of TLC which was also produced by him.

Some of the notable albums and "Greatest Hits" projects he has served as A&R and/or Executive Producer include Mecca and the Soul Brother, Intro, Where I Wanna Be, Story of My Heart, Words, Song Review: A Greatest Hits Collection, and RUN DMC''.

Current projects
Currently, Eddie is very active in producing music for TV and Film. He is currently producing and composing several music scoring, TV network campaigns, and commercial projects for clients such as BET, Centric, McDonald's, Heineken, Jeep/Chrysler and others.

He has also been recently voted in as President of the Georgia Music Industry Association (GMIA.org)

Eddie is also always continuing to focus on further developing his enterprise. He is currently developing several new and exciting artists with "LA" Reid and serving as a technical or music consultant for several industry heavyweights including Steve Stoute, the Legendary Julius "Dr J" Erving, actress Terri Vaughn, as well as BET, Centric Networks, and Andre Harrell.

He continues to write and produce tracks for some of music's most popular artists including Jaheim, Chris Brown, Anthony Hamilton and the last two Grammy winning albums of  Luther Vandross while also developing web technologies and apps.

DJ Eddie F is also a member of the elite "Monster DJs" which is the DJ division of Monster Cable, the partner company of the widely successful "Beats by Dr. Dre" headphones line.

See also
:Category:Albums produced by Eddie F

References

External links
 Instagram official
 Twitter official
 Facebook official
 Interview, HitQuarters

1968 births
African-American male rappers
American hip hop record producers
Living people
Musicians from Mount Vernon, New York
Rappers from New York (state)
21st-century American rappers
Record producers from New York (state)
21st-century American male musicians
21st-century African-American musicians
20th-century African-American people